Zangelanlu Rural District is a rural district (dehestan) in Lotfabad District, Dargaz County, Razavi Khorasan Province, Iran. At the 2006 census, its population was 5,180, in 1,226 families.  The rural district has 10 villages.

References 

Rural Districts of Razavi Khorasan Province
Dargaz County